"Emotionless" may refer to:

"Emotionless" (Drake song)
"Emotionless" (Red Sun Rising song)
"Emotionless", a song by Baboon from Face Down in Turpentine